Farsta is a district in the borough with the same name in southern Stockholm. Farsta is located about eight kilometers south of Stockholm city. The district neighbours to Hökarängen, Sköndal, Larsboda, Farsta Strand and Fagersjö. It is also a metro station on the Green line. The distance between the Stockholm City Centre and Farsta is 8 kilometres.

Sports
The following sports clubs are located in Farsta:
 FOC Farsta

References

Districts of Stockholm